Harbans Lal Khanna was a BJP MLA and president of its Amritsar district branch in Punjab, India.

While leading a procession against the Sikh effort to have holy city status granted to Amritsar, he had released slogans there on 30 May 1981, "Dukki tikki khehan nahin deni, sir te pagri rehan nahin deni; kachh, kara, kirpaan; ehnoon bhejo Pakistan." ("We are not going to let any second or third group exist, we are not going to let a turban remain on any head; the shorts, the iron bangle, the sword, send these to Pakistan"). 

On 14 February 1984, mobs led by Khanna gathered at as many as 56 places in Amritsar to engage in anti-Sikh desecrations. At the Amritsar railway station, a model of the Golden Temple was destroyed. A picture of the fourth Sikh guru, which had been on display for several years, was defaced beyond recognition, with feces and lit cigarettes rubbed into it. Carrying some of the pieces of the replica away, some Sikhs swore revenge.

He was shot by Sikh gunmen in retaliation on April 2, 1984.

References

Bharatiya Janata Party politicians from Punjab
Victims of Sikh terrorism
1984 deaths
Members of the Punjab Legislative Assembly
Politicians from Amritsar
People murdered in Punjab, India
Victims of the insurgency in Punjab
Assassinated Indian politicians
Year of birth missing